Mikko Kuukka (born November 3, 1985) is a Finnish professional ice hockey defenceman who most recently played for Finnish Mestis side Kiekko-Espoo. Prior to that, Kuukka played with Jukurit and UK EIHL side Sheffield Steelers. Kuukka previously played in his native Finland for the  Espoo Blues in the Liiga. Undrafted, Kuuka played two years of major junior North American hockey with the Red Deer Rebels of the Western Hockey League.

References

External links

1985 births
Espoo Blues players
Ilves players
Living people
Lukko players
Mikkelin Jukurit players
Red Deer Rebels players
Sheffield Steelers players
Finnish ice hockey defencemen